The Ministry of Emergency Management is a cabinet-level executive department of the State Council that is responsible for emergency management, work safety, and emergency rescue. It is the result of a merger from emergency management departments in various ministries due to a state council reform in 2018. In addition, it took over the functions of the former paramilitary Firefighting Corps of the People's Armed Police, which is today China Fire and Rescue.

References

External links 
 

2018 establishments in China
Emergency
Ministries established in 2018